F.C. Netanya is an Israeli football club based in Netanya. The club currently plays in Liga Gimel Sharon division.

History
The club was founded in 2012 by Eli Cohen, who previously worked with Maccabi HaSharon Netnaya and named the club after his late mother. The club joined Liga Gimel Sharon division, where they played since, finishing in 8th position in 2015, its best finish to date.

In the State Cup, the club's best achievement is reaching the fourth round, the divisional final, in 2015–16, after beating F.C. Kafr Qasim Nibrass in the divisional semi-final 5–2. The club met Hapoel Ihud Bnei Jatt in the divisional final and lost 1–2.

At youth levels, the club operate Under-19  and Under 17 teams, which play in the regional lower divisions of their youth group.

References

External links
F.C. Netanya Colette Cohen The Israel Football Association 
Official website 

Netanya
Association football clubs established in 2012
2012 establishments in Israel
Sport in Netanya